Giovanni Firpo (born 7 February 1909, date of death unknown) was an Italian racing cyclist. He rode in the 1933 Tour de France.

References

External links
 

1909 births
Year of death missing
Italian male cyclists
People from Serravalle Scrivia
Cyclists from Piedmont
Sportspeople from the Province of Alessandria